A by-election in the seat of Johnston in the Northern Territory was held on 29 February 2020, following the resignation of Ken Vowles, the MLA for Johnston, on 31 January 2020. Vowles was first elected in the 2012 Northern Territory general election, winning 45% of first preference votes and 55.7% of the two-party-preferred vote. At the 2016 Northern Territory general election, Vowles was re-elected with 51% of first preference votes and 64.7% of the two-party-preferred vote.

Former AFL footballer Joel Bowden won the by-election, representing the Labor Party.

Candidates
A total of 7 candidates were declared nominated by the NTEC.

Results

See also
List of Northern Territory by-elections
Electoral results for the division of Johnston

References

External links
2020 Division of Johnston by-election (Northern Territory Electoral Commission)
Johnston by-election (ABC Elections)

Northern Territory by-elections
Johnston
2020s in the Northern Territory